Hawley Lock is a lock on the Regent's Canal, in the London Borough of Camden. It is likely called after the Hawley family who were prominent in Brentford and Boston Manor from the late 1500s onward. The Hawleys held the lease on Brentford market for nearly 200 years.

The nearest London Underground station is Camden Town.

The nearest London Overground station is Camden Road

See also

Canals of the United Kingdom
History of the British canal system

References

Locks on the Regent's Canal
Geography of the London Borough of Camden
Buildings and structures in the London Borough of Camden